Sporting Chance is a 1931 drama film directed and produced by Albert Herman, and written by King Baggot. The film was released on 21 November 1931 by Peerless Pictures Corporation and States Rights.

Premise 
Terry Nolan, a jockey, becomes conceited after achieving success on the racetrack. Eventually, he is suspended for disobedience. Phillip Lawrence, the playboy son of Terry's boss, Phillip Lawrence, Sr., gives Terry the chance to redeem himself in a steeplechase race.

Cast 
William Collier Jr. as Terry Nolan
Claudia Dell as Mary Bascom
James Hall as Phillip Lawrence
Eugene Jackson as Horseshoes
Mahlon Hamilton as Buddy
Hedwiga Reicher as Aunt Hetty
Joseph Levering as Phillip Lawrence, Sr.
Henry Roquemore as Mullins

References

External links 
 
 

1931 films
1931 drama films
American black-and-white films
American horse racing films
American drama films
Films directed by Albert Herman
1930s English-language films
1930s American films